The Catholic Church has engaged in the modern ecumenical movement especially since the Second Vatican Council (1962-1965) and the issuing of the decree Unitatis redintegratio and the declaration Dignitatis humanae. It was at the Council that the Pontifical Council for Promoting Christian Unity was created. Those outside of the Catholic Church were categorised as heretics (in reference to Protestantism) or schismatics (as in the case of the Eastern Orthodox Church and Oriental Orthodox Churches), but in many contexts today, in order to avoid offence, the euphemism "separated brethren" is used.

Definition

Ecumenism, from the Greek word “oikoumene”, meaning “the whole inhabited world” (cf. Acts 17.6; Mt 24.14; Heb 2.5), is the promotion of cooperation and unity among Christians. The Union of Christendom is a traditional Catholic view of ecumenism; the view is that every non-Catholic Christian ecclesial community is destined to return to the unity of the Catholic Church, from which it has broken. As the original Church founded by Jesus Christ according to Catholic doctrine, the Church sees itself as "the one true church". This means that according to such teaching, Christian unity is already a reality, present in the Catholic Church. 

The Catholic Church's commitment to ecumenism was based on the conviction that a divided Christianity "openly contradicts the will of Christ, scandalizes the world, and damages the holy cause of preaching the Gospel to every creature."

"The search for Christian Unity was one of the principal concerns of the Second Vatican Council". This was attested to even from the moment the Council was announced, by Pope John XXIII, during the vespers closing the Octave of Prayer for Christian Unity on 25 January 1959, at the Basilica of Saint Paul Outside the Walls.

"The Catholic Church is committed to working for the reunion of all Christians, but the exuberant spirit following Vatican II has been tempered. Sober minds realize that the road to full unity will be long and arduous. One of the principal ecclesiological tasks is to discern the relationship between the Churches." Underlying the Catholic Church's pursuit of ecumenism is its recognition that elements of sanctification and truth are found in other churches, that, in some sense, these are Christians and particular churches or ecclesial communities, and that common baptism itself impels those toward greater unity, since Baptism is a gift which "belongs" to the Catholic Church as one of the Sacraments which Christ endowed it with.

It can be said that the "ecumenicity" of the Church is another way of expressing her "radical catholicity and/or universality".

The Directory for the Application of Principles and Norms on Ecumenism states that bishops of the Catholic Church, "individually for their own dioceses, and collegially for the whole Church, are, under the authority of the Holy See, responsible for ecumenical policy and practice".

Historical perspectives

Before the Second Vatican Council 

The Catholic Church sees itself as the one, holy, catholic and apostolic church, founded by Christ himself. Its teachings, both before and after the Second Vatican Council, equate the one Church of Christ with the Catholic Church. 

Ecumenism takes as it starting point that Christ founded just one Church, not many churches; hence the Catholic Church has as its ultimate hope and objective that through prayer, study, and dialogue, the historically separated bodies may come again to be reunited with it.

Unity was always a principal aim of the Catholic Church. Before the Second Vatican Council, the Catholic Church defined ecumenism as dialogue with other Christian groups in order to persuade these to return to a unity that they themselves had broken.

At the Second Council of Lyon (1274) and the Council of Florence (1438–42), in which some bishops of the Eastern Orthodox Churches participated, reunion formulas were worked out that failed to win acceptance by the Eastern Churches.

The Catholic Church, even before the Second Vatican Council, always considered it a duty of the highest rank to seek full unity with estranged communions of fellow-Christians, and at the same time to reject what it saw as premature and false union that would mean being unfaithful to or glossing over the teaching of Sacred Scripture and Tradition. But the main stress was laid on caution, as exemplified in canon 1258 the 1917 Code of Canon Law:
 It is illicit for the faithful to assist at or participate in any way in non-Catholic religious functions.
 For a serious reason requiring, in case of doubt, the Bishop's approval, passive or merely material presence at non-Catholic funerals, weddings and similar occasions because of holding a civil office or as a courtesy can be tolerated, provided there is no danger of perversion or scandal.

Since the Second Vatican Council

The aim of the Second Vatican Council, as its initiator Pope John XXIII stated, was to seek renewal from within the Church itself, which would serve for those separated from the see of Rome as a "gentle invitation to seek and find that unity for which Jesus Christ prayed so ardently to his heavenly Father". The Council opened up an era of earnest endeavour not only to explain to others the Church's teaching but also to understand their outlook.

While the Catholic Church sees itself as "the one, holy, catholic and apostolic church" founded by Christ himself, it recognizes that: 

The Catholic Church has since the Second Vatican Council, under Popes John XXIII, Paul VI, and the beginning of the papacy of John Paul II,  reached out to other Christian bodies, seeking reconciliation to the greatest degree possible.

Significant agreements have been achieved on baptism, ministry, and the Eucharist with Anglican theologians. With Evangelical Lutheran bodies, a similar agreement was reached on the theology of justification. These landmark documents have brought closer fraternal ties with those churches.

However, recent developments, such as the ordination of women and of men living in homosexual relationships, present new obstacles to reconciliation with, in particular, Anglicans /Episcopalians. Consequently, in recent years the Catholic Church has focused its efforts at reconciliation with the Eastern Orthodox Church, with which the theological differences are not as great.

While relations with some Eastern Orthodox Churches were strained in the 1990s over property issues in post-Soviet states after the dissolution of the Soviet Union in 1989-1991, these differences are now largely resolved. Fraternal relations with the Eastern churches continue to progress.

The 1983 Code of Canon Law no longer has canons which absolutely forbid the social cooperation of Roman Catholic clergy (bishops, priests and deacons)  with clergy members of other systems of belief. It still absolutely forbids Catholic priests to concelebrate the Eucharist with members of communities not in communion with the Catholic Church (canon 908). The Directory for the Application of Principles and Norms on Ecumenism states: "Christians may be encouraged to share in spiritual activities and resources, i.e., to share that spiritual heritage they have in common in a manner and to a degree appropriate to their present divided state."

Relations with the World Council of Churches
One of the most significant documents on ecumenical relations was Baptism, Eucharist and Ministry, published by the Faith and Order Commission of the World Council of Churches (WCC) in 1982. Although the Catholic Church is not a member of the WCC, some Catholic theologians are full members of the Commission, though not as representatives of their church, and participated in the production of the paper, the aim of which was to seek common ground between the various traditions concerning the Christian rite of initiation (Baptism), the sacrament of the Eucharist, and the nature of holy orders, while also stating clearly the differences existing between them. The churches were invited to indicate their reactions to the contents of the document, with a view to "analyz(ing) the ecumenical implications for the churches at a future World Conference on Faith and Order."

Relations with churches of the East
The Catholic Church recognizes 21 Ecumenical or General Councils: Nicaea I (325), Constantinople I (381), Ephesus (431), Chalcedon (451), Constantinople II (553), Constantinople III (680–681), Nicaea II (787), Constantinople IV (869–870), Lateran I (1123), Lateran II (1139), Lateran III (1179), Lateran IV (1215), Lyons I (1245), Lyons II (1274), Vienne (1311–1312), Constance (1414–1418), Florence (1438–1445), Lateran V (1512–1517), Trent (1545–1563), Vatican I (1869–1870), Vatican II (1962–1965).

Of these, the Eastern Orthodox Church of Byzantine tradition accepts only the first seven, the family of "non-Chalcedonian" or "pre-Chalcedonian" Churches only the first three, and the Assyrian Church of the East only the first two.

In spite of this, dialogue has shown that even where divisions have lasted longer than previous communion – as with the schisms rooted in the Christological controversies at  the Council of Ephesus (431) and the Council of Chalcedon (451) – the few doctrinal differences often but not always concern terminology, not substance. In fact, as little as a decade of dialogue has done more to heal the divisions than fifteen centuries of apologetics, stereotypes, and suspicion.

Assyrian Church of the East

The Catholic Church recognizes in the Assyrian Church of the East as one of the valid successor bodies of the ancient Church of the Mesopotamian valley, where Christianity had been established by around the year 150, though tradition traces apostolic origins with the Apostle Thomas and his disciples-successors Addai and Mari.

The division between the Church of the Persian Empire and the Churches of Rome and Constantinople goes back to the disputes over the legitimacy of the terms mother of God and mother of Christ for the Virgin Mary, that came to a head at the Council of Ephesus in 431. The Assyrian Church had adopted radical Antiochene Christology, as articulated by Nestorius and Theodore of Mopsuestia. They have been sometimes, erroneously, called Nestorian. This appellation is rejected by the Catholic Church.

Dialogue began with a meeting of the Assyrian Patriarch (Catholicos) Mar Dinkha IV and Pope John Paul II in 1984, and the patriarch's participation in the first Assisi Day of Prayer for Peace in 1986. Nearly a decade of dialogue proved sufficient to resolve the disagreements over terminology in Christology, leading to the Common Christological Declaration Between the Catholic Church and the Assyrian Church of the East, signed by Pope John Paul II of the Catholic Church and Mar Dinkha IV of the Assyrian Church of the East in 1994.

The Common Declaration recalls that the Assyrian Church of the East prays to the Virgin Mary as "the Mother of Christ our God and Saviour", and the Catholic tradition addresses the Virgin Mary as "the Mother of God" and also as "the Mother of Christ", fuller expressions by which each Church clearly acknowledges both the divinity and the humanity of Mary's son. The co-signers of the Common Declaration could thus state: "We both recognize the legitimacy and rightness of these expressions of the same faith and we both respect the preference of each Church in her liturgical life and piety."

Over the next six years, annual meetings of the dialogue came to a common understanding of sacraments, published in 2000 as the "Common Statement on Sacramental Life". It was hoped that this too would be raised to the level of a Joint or Common Declaration, while the dialogue moved on to practical ecclesiological, pastoral, and administrative questions for full communion.

However, in 2004, on the eve of a formal common declaration, the Assyrian patriarch and bishops decided to suspend the dialogue, realizing that "all obstacles to restoring full communion with the Catholic Church had been proven to no longer exist".

The following year the Assyrian synod suspended their chief ecumenist of twenty years, Mar Bawai Soro, who had led the dialogue with Rome. In 2008, Mar Bawai, along with six priests, thirty deacons, and about a thousand faithful, broke communion with the Assyrian Church and entered into full communion as part of the Chaldean Catholic Church. The personal tensions from these events further delayed the continuation of reunion talks.

In March 2015, Mar Dinkha IV died. In September 2015, a new Catholicos-Patriarch was elected, Gewargis III.

Dialogue documents
 1994 Common Christological Declaration
 1997 Joint Synodical Decree for Promoting Unity between the Assyrian Church of the East and the Chaldean Catholic Church
 2001 Guidelines for Admission to the Eucharist Between the Chaldean Church and the Assyrian Church of the East

Oriental Orthodox Churches

Since 2003, the Catholic Church has engaged with the entire communion of Oriental Orthodox Churches as a whole, rather than with each autocephalous church in independent dialogues.

Dialogue documents

With individual Oriental Orthodox Churches:
1971 Common Declaration of Pope Paul VI and Mar Ignatus Jacob III of the Malankara Syrian Orthodox Church
1976 Common Christological Declaration of the Catholic Church and the Coptic Church
1984 Common Declaration of Pope John Paul II and Mar Ignatius Zakka I Iwas of the Malankara Syrian Orthodox Church
1989 Joint Statement of the Catholic and Malankara Orthodox Syrian Churches
1990 Doctrinal Agreement on Christology between the Catholic Church and the Malankara  Orthodox Syrian Church
1993 Agreement and Pastoral Guidelines for Inter-Church Marriage between Catholics and Malankara Syrian Orthodox
1999 Joint Statement on the Synod of Diamper (AD 1599) by the Catholic and Malankara Orthodox Syrian Churches

With the Oriental Orthodox Communion as a whole:
2009 Nature, Constitution, and Mission of the Church
2015 The Exercise of Communion in the Life of the Early Church and its Implications for our Search for Communion Today

The Eastern Orthodox Churches

The 1993 Balamand declaration of the Joint International Commission for Theological Dialogue Between the Catholic Church and the Orthodox Church discusses ecclesiological principles and suggests practical rules for both the Catholic Church and the Eastern Orthodox Churches to implement about improving relations by reciprocally avoiding interfering in each other's Churches and not using history in a polemical manner. According to Cardinal Edward Cassidy, the report contains three principles: that individuals have the freedom to follow their conscience, that Eastern Catholic Churches have the right to exist, that uniatism is not the current method of full communion; and two conclusions: that the Catholic Church and the Eastern Orthodox Churches are "sister churches" and that rebaptism should be avoided. The principle that "the inviolable freedom of persons and their obligation to follow the requirements of their conscience", is foundational, according to Cassidy, "and justifies both the personal choice to adhere to the Catholic Church or to the Orthodox Church, and offers the possibility of returning to the Catholic Church for those communities which in 1945–49 had been forced to convert by Communist regimes to become part of the Orthodox Church," as happened in the Ukrainian Soviet Socialist Republic, the Socialist Republic of Romania and the Czechoslovak Socialist Republic. The Eastern Catholics rejected the report "because it seemed to imply they should never have existed in the first place" while the Eastern Orthodox rejected it because it did not call for the abolition of the Eastern Catholic Churches.

On 3 July 2019, it was revealed that during a Vatican meeting with Orthodox Archbishop Job of Telmessos, who represented the Orthodox Church's Ecumenical Patriarch Bartholomew of Constantinople, during the feast of Sts. Peter and Paul on 29 June 2019, Pope Francis stated that unity rather than leveling differences should be the goal between the Catholic and Orthodox Churches. Pope Francis also gave Bartholomew nine bone fragments which were believed to have belonged to St. Peter and which were displayed at a public Mass which was held in the Vatican in November 2013 to celebrate the 'Year of Faith.'

Russian Orthodox Church

In February 2016, Pope Francis and Russian Orthodox Patriarch Kirill held a meeting in Cuba and afterwards issued a joint declaration

On 4 July 2019, however, it was confirmed that tensions still remained between the Vatican and the Russian Orthodox Church, with the Ukrainian conflict serving as a major cause of these tensions. Despite holding a "cordial" meeting with Russian President Vladimir Putin in the Vatican, Pope Francis stated it is unlikely that he will visit Russia unless Putin agrees to not include the Russian Orthodox Church in the invitation, which Putin stated would be unlikely as well. Pope Francis has also declared support for the Ukrainian Greek Catholic Church, which has expressed opposition to Putin and the Russian Orthodox Church.  During the first day of a meeting with Ukrainian Greek Catholic Church leaders on 5 July 2019, Pope Francis also accused the Russian Orthodox Church of attempting to manipulate "other religions" in Ukraine as well.

Relations with churches and communions of the West

Lutheran Churches
The Catholic–Lutheran dialogue began over thirty years ago, and has consisted of eleven rounds of discussion. The most recent discussion has focused on doctrines associated with eternal life. The dialogue process has produced one major joint declaration, concerning the doctrine of justification, issued in 1999 called the Joint Declaration on the Doctrine of Justification.

On Reformation Day in 2016, Pope Francis of the Catholic Church travelled to Sweden (where the Lutheran Church is the national Church) to commemorate the 500th anniversary of the Reformation at Lund Cathedral, which serves as the cathedra for the Bishop of Lund of the Church of Sweden, a Lutheran Church. An official press release from the Holy See stated:

An ecumenical service was presided over by Bishop Munib Younan, the president of the Lutheran World Federation, the General Secretary of the LWF, as well as Pope Francis, the leader of the Catholic Church. 

Sr. Susan Wood, a Sister of Charity, who is a systematic theology professor and chair of the theology department at Marquette University and a former president of the Catholic Theological Society of America, stated that "Since Vatican II, we have acknowledged an imperfect communion between Lutheran and Catholics" and that she personally believed that "there is no substantial difference in Lutheran and Catholic belief in the real presence of Christ in the Eucharist". Wood claimed without evidence that in the near future she thought that intercommunion could happen in places "where people can't get out, like nursing homes and prisons." However, besides the generally radically different doctrines of Lutheranism and Catholicism, the fact remains that the Catholic Church does not acknowledge the Lutheran eucharist as valid.

The Anglican Communion

Historic tensions
Long-term hostility between the Catholic Church and the Anglican Communion was engendered by resistance among some English to the declaration of royal supremacy of King Henry VIII over the Church in England, the confiscation of Church properties, the dissolution of the monasteries, guilds and chantries, the execution of priests, forced attendance at Anglican worship, the forced payment of tithes to the state church and the illegalization of the Catholic faith.

There was a brief restoration of communion with Rome during the reign of Mary I of England. Her death marked the end of Catholic attempts to reconcile by law the English Church to Rome. Subsequently, Pope Pius V's excommunication of Elizabeth I of England in 1570 and authorisation of rebellion against her contributed to official suspicion of the allegiances of English Catholics. This, combined with a desire to assert the claims of the established church, led to the promulgation of restrictive laws against their civil and religious rights. Elizabethan era restrictions were only relieved through several legislative reforms in the 19th century, cumulatively known as Catholic emancipation. The last restriction on Catholics preventing them from marrying into the royal family was removed in 2013, though they cannot become monarch since as such they would be the head of the Church of England.

Apostolicae curae

In 1896 Pope Leo XIII issued Apostolicae curae rejecting the Anglo-Catholic claims of the Oxford Movement and the Chicago-Lambeth Quadrilateral, such as apostolic succession. In it Leo XIII declared Anglican orders "absolutely null and utterly void." The official reply of the Archbishops of the Church of England was Saepius officio. The judgment remains in effect to the present. The judgment of nullity was reaffirmed in 1998 by the Congregation for the Doctrine of the Faith, when it gave Apostolicae curae as an example of the authoritative teaching of the Catholic Church.

Early ecumenism
Some attempts at dialogue began in 1915, when Pope Benedict XV approved a British Legation to the Vatican, led by an Anglican with a Catholic deputy. However, discussion of potential reunion in the Malines Conversations eventually collapsed in 1925. Continued efforts resulted in the spread of the Week of Prayer for Christian Unity in both churches (and others), and the visit of George Bell, Bishop of Chichester, to Cardinal Giovanni Montini of Milan in 1955.

Post–Second Vatican Council developments
Real rapprochement was achieved under the leadership of Pope John XXIII, whose foundation of the "Secretariat for the Promotion of Christian Unity" encouraged Archbishop Geoffrey Fisher to make a historic, though not entirely official, visit to the Vatican in 1960. Subsequently, the Bishop of Ripon, John Moorman, led a delegation of Anglican observers to the Second Vatican Council. In 1966, Archbishop Michael Ramsey made an official visit to Pope Paul VI, and in the following year, the Anglican–Roman Catholic International Commission (ARCIC) was established. Its first project focused on the authority of Scripture, and the Commission has since produced nine agreed statements. Phase One of ARCIC ended in 1981 with the publication of a final report, Elucidations on Authority in the Church. Phase Two has been ongoing since 1983. The most recent agreed statement dealt with Marian theology, and was published in 2004.

Paul VI went so far as to refer to the Anglican Church as "our beloved sister Church", though this description might not tie in with present thinking in the Vatican. Until recently it was used by the website of the Roman Catholic Ampleforth College (referring to Anglican pupils at that school).

"Given the significant extent of our common understanding of the Eucharist  and the central importance of the Eucharist to our faith," ARCIC wrote in a non-authoritative statement, Growing together in unity and mission (GTUM), that "we encourage attendance at each other's Eucharists, respecting the different disciplines of our churches."  suggests that "We encourage Anglicans and Roman Catholics to pray for the local bishop of the other church as well as for their own bishop, and for God's blessing on their co-operation where possible in their leadership of the local churches' mission. We welcome the growing Anglican custom of including in the prayers of the faithful a prayer for the pope, and we invite Roman Catholics to pray regularly in public for the Archbishop of Canterbury and the leaders of the Anglican Communion." Since both mutually recognize their administration of baptism,  suggests that "a number of practical initiatives are possible. Local churches may consider developing joint programmes for the formation of families when they present children for baptism, as well as preparing common catechetical resources for use in baptismal and confirmation preparation and in Sunday schools. We suggest that our local parishes regularly make a public profession of faith together, perhaps by renewing baptismal promises at Pentecost each year. We invite local churches to use the same baptismal certificate, and, where necessary, to review and improve those currently in use. While respecting current canonical requirements, we also encourage the inclusion of witnesses from the other church at baptisms and confirmations, particularly in the case of candidates from interchurch families."

New tensions
Despite the productivity of these discussions, dialogue is strained by the developments in some provinces of the Anglican Communion of the ordination of women, of permissive teaching on abortion, and of the ordination of those in public same-sex sexual relationships as priests and, in one case, a bishop (Gene Robinson). More progress has been made with respect to Anglican churches outside the Communion.

Cardinal Walter Kasper, president of the Pontifical Council for Promoting Christian Unity, warned that if the Church of England was to ordain women as bishops, as the Episcopal Church has done, then it could destroy any chance of reuniting the Anglican and Catholic Churches. Although ARCIC had completed a major document on Marian theology in 2003, John Paul II temporarily called off all future talks between the Catholic Church and the Anglican Communion after the consecration of Gene Robinson as bishop.

John Paul II made Pastoral Provision for Anglican congregations which as a whole wish to enter into full communion with the Holy See. There has been only a small number of Anglican Use parishes, all of which are in the United States. These are Roman Catholic parishes which are allowed to retain some features of the Book of Common Prayer in worship. Additionally, one of the Continuing Anglican Churches attempted to achieve the recognition of Rome without abandoning its liturgical traditions, as the Anglican Use parishes have done.

According to canon 844 of the 1983 Code of Canon Law of the Latin Church, Catholics should not receive communion from an Anglican minister and Catholic ministers could administer to an Anglican the sacraments of Eucharist, Penance and Anointing of the Sick only in danger of death or some other grave and pressing need, and provided the Anglican in question cannot approach an Anglican priest, spontaneously asks for the sacrament, demonstrates the faith of the Catholic Church in respect of the sacrament and is properly disposed (canon 844 §4).

Personal ordinariates

In October 2009, the Congregation for the Doctrine of the Faith announced Pope Benedict XVI's intention to create a new type of ecclesiastical structure, called a personal ordinariate, for groups of Anglicans entering into full communion with the see of Rome. The plan created the personal ordinariate structures for former Anglicans within the Catholic Church independent of existing Latin Church dioceses. It would allow them to preserve elements of Anglican liturgy, spirituality and religious practice, including married priests but not married bishops. Anglicanorum coetibus was issued on 4 November 2009. "The Personal Ordinariate of the Chair of St. Peter is equivalent to a diocese, created by the Vatican in 2012 for people nurtured in the Anglican tradition who wish to become Catholic."

Old Catholic Churches
The Old Catholic Archdiocese of Utrecht was formed in 1703
 in the area occupied by the historical Roman Catholic Archdiocese of Utrecht, which had been canonically suppressed in response to the Protestant Reformation in 1580 and superseded by the Dutch Mission erected in 1592.

After 1870 several German-speaking Catholics left the Catholic Church in light of the First Vatican Council. Many aligned themselves with the independent Bishop of Utrecht, who ordained clergy among them to form the Old Catholic Churches. Though it is not in communion, the Catholic Church recognizes as valid the Old Catholic holy orders and apostolic succession, but does not recognize their ordinations of women to the priesthood begun in the 1970s. The Old Catholic Churches consider themselves to be in full communion with the Anglican Communion.

The Polish National Catholic Church ceased intercommunion with both the Anglican Communion in 1978 and the Union of Utrecht member churches in 1996, disagreeing over the issue of female ordination. It has since become closer to Rome, which recognizes it to have a similar status as the Orthodox Churches.

Reformed Churches (Continental Reformed, Presbyterian, and Congregationalist)
In 2010, the Catholic Church and the Reformed Churches ratified the Common Agreement on Mutual Recognition of Baptism. As such, both the Catholic Church and the Reformed Churches recognize the validity of baptism performed in each of these denominations.

Practical ecumenism and church attendance
In many areas of the United Kingdom where there is only one Christian church (such as Anglican, Baptist, Methodist or United Reformed), it may "extend a Declaration of Ecumenical Welcome and Commitment to Christians of other denominations inviting them to be part of the life and witness of that worshipping congregation." The following guidelines were offered by the Catholic Bishops' Conference of England and Wales for the faithful:

Roman Catholic Archbishop John Bathersby and Anglican Bishop David Beetge, who chair the International Anglican–Roman Catholic Commission for Unity and Mission, encouraged Protestants and Catholics to attend one another's services, although not receiving Holy Communion at them, as delineated in Growing Together in Unity and Mission:

Pope Francis said that in northern Argentina, the Anglican bishop and Roman Catholic bishop, both of whom are friends, work together to teach at Christian missions with the aborigines. With the Congregation for the Doctrine of the Faith having knowledge of this, both Anglicans and Roman Catholics attend each other's Masses, engaging "in charity together". Praising this ecumenism, Pope Francis declared that "I think this is a richness that our young Churches can bring to Europe and to the Churches that have a great tradition." Pope Francis recalled his own friendship with the Anglicans of Buenos Aires, given that the Anglican Cathedral of St. John the Baptist was juxtaposed with the Roman Catholic parish of Merced.

Major documents

Council documents
 1274 Second Council of Lyon, Session IV: Declaration of Union with the Greek Churches
 1439 Council of Basle-Ferrara-Florence, Laetentur Caeli: Bull of Union with the Greeks
 1964 Second Vatican Council, Lumen gentium: Dogmatic Constitution on the Church
 1964 Second Vatican Council, Unitatis redintegratio: Decree on Ecumenism

Papal documents
Pope Leo XIII
 1896 Apostolicae curae
 1899 Testem benevolentiae nostrae
Pope Pius XI
 1928 Mortalium animos
Pope Pius XII
 1950 Humani generis
Pope John XXIII
 1962 Gaudet Mater Ecclesia
Pope John Paul II
 1995 Ut unum sint
 1995 Orientale lumen
 1999 Joint Declaration on the Doctrine of Justification

Curial documents
 1993 Directory for the Application of Principles and Norms on Ecumenism 
 1995 The Ecumenical Dimension in the Formation of Those Engaged in Pastoral Work
 2000 Dominus Iesus

Extracts
Some elements of the Roman Catholic perspective on ecumenism are illustrated in the following quotations from the Second Vatican Council's 1964 decree on ecumenism, Unitatis Redintegratio (UR) and John Paul II's 1995 encyclical, Ut unum sint (UUS).

See also

East–West Schism
International Council of Christians and Jews, a group engaged in Christian-Jewish dialogue
John Paul II Center for Interreligious Dialogue
Pontifical Council for Interreligious Dialogue
Protestant Reformation
Timeline of the Catholic Church

Notes

References